Newport Wetlands is a wildlife reserve covering parts of Uskmouth, Nash and Goldcliff, in the south-east of the city of Newport, South Wales.

History 
The reserve was established in 2000 to mitigate losses of wildlife habitat when the Cardiff Bay Barrage scheme was undertaken.

The site is owned and managed by Natural Resources Wales, the successor body to the Countryside Council for Wales. A purpose-built visitor and education centre for the site was opened, in West Nash, in March 2008 by the Royal Society for the Protection of Birds (RSPB) with help from Newport City Council and water level management assistance by Caldicot and Wentloog Levels Internal Drainage Board.

Part of the site is a reclaimed fuel ash disposal site, although some farmland in Goldcliff and Nash has also had to be flooded to complete the work.

The reserve was made a national nature reserve on 16 April 2008.

Access and facilities

Entrance is free, with car parking facilities open every day of the year from 9:00 am until 5:00 pm. The visitor and education centre are open every day except Christmas Day.
The visitor centre provides a shop, refreshments, bathroom facilities, viewing facilities and guided tours. Dogs and cyclists are permitted outside the visitor centre and along a specially marked  circular route around the reserve's perimeter which is accessed via a path next to the car park exit. Initially heading west, the route follows alongside the power station then turns to the east past the East Usk Lighthouse and along the Severn Estuary (Wales Coast Path). After dropping below the sea wall the path splits, with a pedestrian and dog walking route returning to the visitor centre via a marked path to the left. A longer pedestrian and cycling route continues forwards towards Goldcliff village and the local road network.

Next to the visitor centre is a picnic and play area, which provides a children's play area, education zone, and benches for picnics.

The far end of the main trail faces south towards the Severn Estuary, along which the East Usk Lighthouse and a bird hide overlooking lagoon R9 are situated.
There is also a woodland trail, which is entered by turning left at the top of the hill. The trail travels past neighbouring farmland, through the reserve's woodlands, past a lagoon viewing platform which overlooks lagoon R8, and onto the estuary trail.

Flora and fauna
The reserve includes a wide variety of habitats which include grazed pasture with hedgerows, ditches, reens, reed beds and grasslands. These help to attract breeding birds such as lapwing, redshank, oystercatcher, little ringed plover and ringed plover, as well as visitors such as wigeon, northern shoveler, teal, shelduck and pintail, hen harrier and short-eared owl.
In 2020, two pairs of bittern successfully bred at the site, for the first time in south Wales for over 200 years. The Goldcliff Lagoons, which form the eastern end of the reserve, is the only site in south Wales where avocet breed.

Floating walkway
The reserve contains an artificial floating walkway, which provides a direct route to the lighthouse over lagoon R7. This lagoon is part of a series of a total of three lagoons spanning the coastal path (east to west). The most eastward lagoon (R9) is overlooked by a bird hide in addition to being viewable from a fenced overpass, and the most westwardly lagoon (R4) is viewable from a fenced overpass.

East Usk Lighthouse

The East Usk Lighthouse is within the reserve on the estuary trail facing towards the Severn Estuary. It is a basic lamphousing with no accommodation. The more substantial decommissioned West Usk Lighthouse, currently operating as a hotel, is on the opposite (west) bank of the River Usk and can be viewed from the reserve. It was constructed in 1893 by Trinity House and entered service on or about 22 June that year.

References

External links
 RSBP trail map
 Newport City Council - Newport Wetlands
 BBC News - £3m visitors' centre for wetlands
 BBC - Newport Wetlands
 RSPB - Newport Wetlands
 Caldicot & Wentlooge Level Internal Drainage Board
 www.geograph.co.uk : photos of Newport Wetlands Reserve and surrounding area
 eBird.org

Culture in Newport, Wales
Education in Newport, Wales
Tourist attractions in Newport, Wales
Wetlands of Newport, Wales
Nature centres in Wales
Nature reserves in Wales
Royal Society for the Protection of Birds reserves in Wales
Protected areas established in 2000
Coast of Newport, Wales
Lighthouses in Wales